DENIS-P J1058.7-1548 is a brown dwarf of spectral type L3, located in constellation Crater at approximately 17.3 parsecs or 56.5 light-years from Earth. Its spectrum was used as a standard to define the spectral class L3 back in 1997. With a surface temperature of between 1700 and 2000 K, it is cool enough for clouds to form. Variations in its brightness in visible and infrared spectra suggest it has some form of atmospheric cloud cover.

See also
 Deep Near Infrared Survey of the Southern Sky
 DENIS-P J1228.2-1547
 DENIS-P J020529.0-115925
 DENIS-P J082303.1-491201 b
 DENIS-P J101807.5-285931

References

External links
SIMBAD: 2MUCD 10949 -- Brown Dwarf (M<0.08solMass)

Crater (constellation)
Brown dwarfs
L-type stars
J10584787-1548172
DENIS objects
Astronomical objects discovered in 1997